Riga is a surname. Notable people with the surname include:

Bill Riga (born 1974), American hockey coach
José Riga (born 1957), Belgian football player and manager
Petrus Riga ( 1140–1209), French poet
Stevie Riga (born 1989), French football player